Raisen is a town and a municipality in Raisen district in the Indian state of Madhya Pradesh. It is the administrative headquarters of Raisen District. Raisen takes its name from the massive fort at the top of a hill. The town is located at the foot. The name is probably a corruption of Rajavasini or Rajasayan—the royal residence. The famous places to visit in  Raisen district are Raisen Fort, Dargah, and Sanchi Stupa.

Raisen was repeatedly attacked by the Mughal Army in the early 16th century. In 1528, the first jauhar was led by Rani Chanderi. After the Mughal army left, the kingdom refused to accept orders from Delhi. After a long siege of Raisen fort, that exhausted all supplies within the fort, Rani Durgavati and 700 Raisen women committed the second jauhar in 1532, the men led by Lakshman Tomar committed saka. This refusal to submit to Mughal rule repeated, and in 1543 the third jauhar was led by Rani Ratnavali.

Geography
The region is predominantly agrarian.

Transport 
The nearest airport is Bhopal Airport.

Tourist attraction
Raisen is mainly known for its ancient age tourist attractions such as Raisen Fort, Sanchi Stupa, Bhimbetka and Bhojpur town. The city is surrounded by hills and witnesses a number of tourists visiting the city every year.

Raisen fort 
Raisen fort is one of the ancient forts of Madhya Pradesh built in 11th century. It is located on the north west corner of the Gondwana on a hilltop on Vindhyanchal range. It has been known for Shiva temple and Mahashivaratri celebrations. Raisen fort has strong connection with Sallam (Salame) dynasty of Gondwana who has also erected two strong forts ( Ginnaurgarh fort and Fatehgarh fort) in Bhopal Gondwana kingdom. Raja Sangram Shah and Rani Durgavati of Garha Mandla had strongholds through many other Rajput kings on this fort until 1564. Sher Shah Suri also repeatedly tried to capture this fort after the 15th century.

Raisen in Madhya Pradesh was repeatedly attacked by the Mughal Army in the early 16th century. In 1528, the first jauhar was led by Rani Chanderi. After the Mughal army left, the kingdom refused to accept orders from Delhi. After a long siege of Raisen fort, that exhausted all supplies within the fort, Rani Durgavati and 700 Raisen women committed the second jauhar in 1532, the men led by Lakshman Tuar committed saka. This refusal to submit to Mughal rule repeated, and in 1543 the third jauhar was led by Rani Ratnavali.

Sanchi Stupa 
Sanchi Stupa is a Buddhist complex and world heritage site situated on the hilltop of Sanchi town. The Stupa was constructed by emperor Ashoka in 3rd century BCE. Many tourists (mostly people belonging to Buddhist community) visit Sanchi every year. A museum is also built in the town which has multiple historical items belonging to Stupa.

Bhojpur 
Bhojpur is an ancient and religious town in the Raisen district and one of the most popular tourist attraction in Madhya Pradesh. Bhojpur is mainly known for its unfinished Bhojeshwar Temple and Jain Temple. The Bhojeshwar Temple has 18 feet Shivalinga which is known as largest Shivalinga in the world built in ancient time. A Jain temple is also built near to the Bhojeshwar Temple.

Bhimbetka 
The Bhimbetka rock shelters are an archaeological site in the Raisen District that spans the prehistoric paleolithic and mesolithic periods, as well as the historic period. It exhibits the earliest traces of human life on the Indian subcontinent and evidence of Stone Age starting at the site in Acheulian times.

Demographics
 India census, Raisen had a population of 35,553. Males constitute 53% of the population and females 47%. Raisen has an average literacy rate of 66%, higher than the national average of 59.5%: male literacy is 72%, and female literacy is 59%. In Raisen, 15% of the population is under 6 years of age.

References

 
Cities and towns in Raisen district
Raisen Fort